The Junior League is an annual professional wrestling round-robin tournament held by All Japan Pro Wrestling, to decide the promotion's top junior heavyweight wrestler, as well as the #1 contender to the World Junior Heavyweight Championship. It was established in 1983 as a single-block round-robin tournament then in 2006, it began as a two-block round-robin tournament, in which each block's highest scorers face off in the finals. A victory is worth two points, a draw is worth one, and a loss zero; each match has a thirty-minute time limit. In 2012, the tournament was renamed the "Junior Hyper League". After no tournament took place in 2013, the 2014 tournament was dubbed "Jr. Battle of Glory", being announced to take place in February, instead of its usual place in the summer.

After a break due to the ongoing COVID-19 pandemic in 2020, the event was stalled and postponed. The tournament returned in 2021 but as a two-day event presenting a 16-man single elimination tournament.

The first winner of the tournament was Chavo Guerrero in 1983 and the latest one is Francesco Akira who won it in June 2021. Kai, Kotaro Suzuki, Shuji Kondo, and Koji Iwamoto are the only wrestlers to hold the title of champions on more than one occasion each.

Results

List of winners

1983
In 1983, All Japan Pro Wrestling held the "NWA International Junior Heavyweight Title League" between May 12 and 26, 1983. The winner, Chavo Guerrero, also won the vacant NWA International Junior Heavyweight Championship.

1998
In 1998, All Japan Pro Wrestling held the "World Junior Heavyweight Title League" between July 6 and 19, 1998. The winner, Yoshinari Ogawa, also won the vacant World Junior Heavyweight Championship.

2003
The 2003 Junior League was held from March 28 to April 10, 2003. The winner, Carl Contini, went on to unsuccessfully challenge Kendo Kashin for the World Junior Heavyweight Championship on April 12, 2003.

2006
The 2006 Junior League was held from June 25 to July 3 over six shows and featured two blocks of four. Foreign participation included Taka Michinoku from Kaientai Dojo and Virus from Consejo Mundial de Lucha Libre. The winner, Kaz Hayashi, won every match he participated in; he went on to fail in his challenge to Junior Heavyweight champion Shuji Kondo on August 27. Note that "brother" YASSHI wrestled as "strong" YASSHI for two of his matches.

2007
The 2007 Junior League, was held from June 24 to July 1 over six shows, involving two blocks of five. Foreign participation included Chris Sabin from Total Nonstop Action Wrestling. Unlike the previous year, the Junior Heavyweight champion, Katsuhiko Nakajima, was allowed to compete.

2008
The 2008 Junior League featured two blocks of five and is being held from July 20 to August 3 over nine shows.

2009
The 2009 Junior League featured two blocks of five and is being held from July 26 to August 7 over eight shows. Foreign participants included Petey Williams and Super Crazy. The winner, Shuji Kondo, went on to fail in his challenge to Junior Heavyweight champion Kaz Hayashi on August 30.

2010
The 2010 Junior League featured two blocks of six and was held from July 25 to August 8 over nine shows. The winner, Jimmy Yang, went on to unsuccessfully challenge Kaz Hayashi for the World Junior Heavyweight Championship on August 29, 2010.

2011
The 2011 Junior League featured two blocks of six and was held from September 11 to September 25 over nine shows. With his win, KAI became the first person to have won the tournament twice.

2012
The 2012 Junior League, dubbed "Junior Hyper League", featured two blocks of six and was held from July 15 to July 29 over ten shows.

2014
The 2014 Junior League, dubbed "Jr. Battle of Glory", featured two blocks of five and was held from February 5 to February 16 over eight shows.

2015
The 2015 Jr. Battle of Glory featured two blocks of five and was held from February 7 to February 20 over nine shows.

2016
The 2016 Jr. Battle of Glory featured two blocks of four and was held from February 12 to February 21 over five shows and contested for the vacant World Junior Heavyweight Championship. Originally Kazuki Hashimoto won block B, but had to pull out of the finals due to a hand fracture, leading to AJPW booking a playoff match between Hikaru Sato and Atsushi Maruyama to determine the finalist.

2017
The 2017 Jr. Battle of Glory featured two blocks of five and was held from February 17 to February 26 over six shows.

2018
The 2018 Jr. Battle of Glory will feature two blocks of six and will be held from February 13 to February 25 over nine shows.

2019
The 2019 Junior League featured two blocks of six and was held from February 7 to February 24 over eleven shows.

2021
The 2021 edition featured a single elimination tournament that took place between June 2 and June 3, 2021.

2022
The 2022 Junior League features one block of six participants and is held at the same time as the World's Strongest Tag Determination League between November 13 and December 7.

References

All Japan Pro Wrestling tournaments